Thomas Cresswell Lace (born 27 May 1998) is an English cricketer.

Lace came through the youth setup at Middlesex. He spent two seasons on loan with Derbyshire, making his first-class debut for them in the 2018 County Championship on 29 August 2018, and his List A debut on 19 April 2019, in the 2019 Royal London One-Day Cup.

Having scored 835 runs, including three centuries, at an average of 43.33 in the County Championship for Derbyshire in 2019, Lace returned to Middlesex where he signed a new contract to keep him at the club through the 2022 season. In August 2020, he joined Gloucestershire, after Middlesex agreed to let him go. He made his Twenty20 debut on 29 May 2022, for Gloucestershire against the Sri Lanka Cricket Development XI during their tour of England.

References

External links
 

1998 births
Living people
English cricketers
Derbyshire cricketers
Gloucestershire cricketers
Middlesex cricketers
People from Hammersmith